When We All Fall Asleep, Where Do We Go? (stylized in all caps) is the debut studio album by American singer and songwriter Billie Eilish. It was released on March 29, 2019, by Darkroom and Interscope Records in the US and Polydor Records in the UK. Eilish, aged 17 at the time of release, largely wrote the album with her brother Finneas O'Connell, who produced it at his small bedroom studio in Highland Park, Los Angeles.

Musically, When We All Fall Asleep, Where Do We Go? is a pop, electropop, avant-pop, and art pop record, though it also features influences from hip hop and industrial music. Its songs explore themes such as modern youth, drug addiction, heartbreak, suicide, and mental health, with lyrical sensibilities of humor and horror. Eilish said the album was inspired in part by lucid dreaming and night terrors, which are reflected on the cover photo.

The album was marketed with the release of seven singles, four of which received multi-platinum certifications in the US—"You Should See Me in a Crown", "When the Party's Over", "Bury a Friend", and the worldwide hit "Bad Guy". Eilish also embarked on several tours in support of the album, including the When We All Fall Asleep Tour and the Where Do We Go? World Tour. An immediate commercial success, the album topped record charts in many countries during its first week of release. By June 2019, it had sold more than 1.3 million copies in the US and become the year's best-selling album in Canada, while in the UK, it had made Eilish the youngest female solo act to chart at number one.

Upon release, When We All Fall Asleep, Where Do We Go? received universal acclaim and was one of the year's most acclaimed albums. Many reviewers praised its subject matter, songwriting, cohesiveness, and Eilish's vocal styling. At the 2020 Grammy Awards, it won Album of the Year, Best Pop Vocal Album, and Best Engineered Album, Non-Classical, while "Bad Guy" won Record of the Year and Song of the Year; Finneas also won the award for Producer of the Year, Non-Classical. In 2020, the album was ranked at 397 on Rolling Stone's 500 Greatest Albums of All Time list.

Writing and recording

Billie Eilish and her brother Finneas O'Connell began working on When We All Fall Asleep, Where Do We Go? in May 2016 with the track "Listen Before I Go", but re-recorded the song two years later in spring 2018. Eilish intended the album to contain material "that's so fun to be in the moment at a show to" as well as "shit that's crazy and also depressing." She further wished to "do everything in this album" due to her hatred for genre restrictions.

The album was recorded in O'Connell's small bedroom studio in Highland Park, California using production material including Logic Pro X, a Universal Audio Apollo 8 interface and a pair of Yamaha HS5 studio monitors with an H8S subwoofer. The pair explained that they chose this recording location rather than a professional studio due to the bedroom's intimate and homely nature as well as the manner in which the bedroom affects vocals, while criticizing an external studio's lack of natural light and high cost of use. Despite the independence of the writing process, they were nonetheless subject to deadlines and meetings with Eilish's label, Darkroom/Interscope; she later stated that she "hated every second" of the album's creation. Audio mixing was handled by Rob Kinelski, who had mixed all of Eilish's work thus far. In an interview with Billboard, Kinelski disclosed that O'Connell would send him "really nice stems" for separate instruments during the process.

On March 20, 2018, Eilish confirmed that she was working on an album and estimated that it would be released towards the end of the year. In July 2018, during an interview with BBC Radio 1, she announced that the album was expected to be out on March 29, 2019. The album was mastered and finished in January 2019.

Music and lyrics 
Eilish's vocal style on When We All Fall Asleep has frequently been described as soft and whispered by music critics. Neil McCormick of The Daily Telegraph stated that the singer's tone "can shift from coquettish to threatening, playfully ironic to emotionally sincere in a breath", adding that her "close-to-the-mic singing is enhanced by layers of ethereal harmonies without swamping a sense of intimacy." It has further been likened to ASMR; while some reviewers simply stated that her voice reminded them of the sensation, others stated that they experienced "tingles" listening to Eillish's vocals, with Helen Holmes of Observer citing the singer's "little giggles and intonations, and the way her intonation 'falls off' at the end of sentences" as the reasons.

The album is built around O'Connell's production which frequently incorporates amplified bass, minimalist percussion, and additional foley and acoustic sounds. While the song structures on the record are traditional in construction, made of formal melodies accompanied with keyboard, guitar or bass instrumentation, it further incorporates harsh, industrial influences, prompting Jon Caramanica of The New York Times to describe Eilish as "the first SoundCloud-rap pop star, without the rapping." Chris Willman of Variety also noted the album's usage of dissonance and distortion, commenting that, "With all its moments of distortion and attitude, tempered by sheer loveliness, and rude and emotional songs about night terrors and daydreams, When We All Fall Asleep, Where Do We Go? feels like a rock 'n' roll album, even if there's virtually nothing on it that sounds like rock music." Elsewhere, critics have highlighted indie electronic, pop, EDM, dance-pop, synth-pop, R&B, trap and jazz influences. The record has been noted for its minimalist and hip hop-inspired production, leading to comparisons to Lorde's debut album Pure Heroine, which was largely the aim of the siblings, as they found that adding additional musical features often makes a song sound "way worse".

Because Eilish draws on a variety of genres, Yasmin Cowan of Clash opined that "to confine [her] to any specific brand of music would be doing her craft a disservice," although other reviewers have characterized When We All Fall Asleep as a pop, electropop, avant-pop, and art pop album. Robert Christgau describes it as "electro-saturated", and Chris Riemenschneider from the Star Tribune calls it "jaggedly rhythmic, candidly intimate stream-of-consciousness electro-pop", while Rolling Stone writer Suzy Exposito finds it "full of dressed-down avant-pop with D.I.Y. immediacy and intimacy" yet still comparable to the maximalist pop of Eilish's contemporaries Ariana Grande and Halsey. According to Amanda Petrusich from The New Yorker, Eilish's "spare, portentous" style of electropop "recalls the work of Trent Reznor, but is imbued with far more friskiness, conviviality, and youthful nonchalance". In Tom Hull's opinion, the album's electropop songs have a quality of catchiness but feature unobtrusive hooks.

Lyrically, the album deals with the hopes and fears of contemporary youth, touching on themes of drug addiction, heartbreak, climate change, mental health and suicide. In an interview with Zane Lowe, Eilish explained that the album was largely inspired by lucid dreaming and night terrors, revealing that it "is basically what happens when you fall asleep," hence its title, and stated at an earlier interview that it "is basically supposed to be a bad dream, or a good dream". i-D writer Jack Hall noted that in order to deal with the record's serious subject matter in a less portentous manner, Eilish writes with humor and horror in a manner similar to memes. Despite this, it is unclear whether the experiences found in the lyrics are her own, since she often distances herself from the content of her songs. The singer explained to Rolling Stone that she and her brother "like writing from other people's perspectives," elaborating that half of the songs on the album "are fictional and half are things [she] was going through, and no one will ever know which is which." In 2021, Eilish stated that the album was "almost all fictional".

Songs
The album's opening track, "!!!!!!!", is a short intro in which Eilish slurps saliva from her Invisalign aligners and announces that "this is the album", before she and her brother descend into laughter. O'Connell explained that it served to "find a sense of humor" amidst the "heaviness" of the album. The following track, "Bad Guy", is a pop-trap song which uses a bass, a kick-drum and amplified finger snaps in its production. The song's lyrics feature Eilish taunting her partner, while suggesting that she is the "bad guy" rather than him. Eilish was inspired to write "Xanny" after attending a party at which her friends "kept throwing up, kept drinking more," consequently becoming "completely not who they were". While recording the song, Eilish and her brother created a sound inspired by a girl blowing cigarette smoke in the former's face alongside a drum kit and a jazz-inspired loop in order to replicate the feeling of being "in secondhand smoke".

"You Should See Me in a Crown", which the two siblings wrote after watching the third episode of the second season of BBC television series Sherlock titled "The Reichenbach Fall", is a trap-influenced electropop song which features Eilish singing over "blaring synths and rapid-fire hi-hats." "All the Good Girls Go to Hell" was described by Stereogum as a "punchy piano number" and one of the album's "poppiest tracks," and explores the idea that God and the Devil are both "looking at human beings as this kind of meek group of people and just being like, "What are they trying to do here?"" The following track, "Wish You Were Gay", is a jazzy classic pop song where Eilish sings of her wish that a man she likes was gay in order to explain his lack of romantic interest in her. The seventh song on the album, "When the Party's Over", is a piano ballad with choral influences, and was written after O'Connell had left his date's house "kind of for no reason."

The eighth track, titled "8", is a ukulele-based lullaby which manipulates Eilish's vocals to make her sound like a small child. The following song, "My Strange Addiction", is a bass-heavy pop song which samples audio from an episode of the American television sitcom The Office titled "Threat Level Midnight". In order to include the samples, Eilish needed the approval of Steve Carell, B. J. Novak, John Krasinski and Mindy Kaling, the members of the episode's cast featured in the audio, which they all personally granted. The next track, "Bury a Friend", has been described as a minimalist electronica and industrial song, and musically features a beat reminiscent of "Black Skinhead" by Kanye West, a vocal line similar to "People Are Strange" by the Doors, and scattered synth melodies. It is written from the perspective of a monster under a bed, exploring what "this creature [is] doing or feeling", with lyrics from which the album title originates. The song's beat segues into the eleventh track "Ilomilo", an electropop cut named after the 2010 video game, in order to give the album further cohesion.

The final three tracks have titles that form a sentence: "Listen Before I Go, I Love You, Goodbye". In an interview with Vulture, O'Connell stated that his sister "liked the readability of that" before adding that "they are [related]" since they are "different sentiments about a farewell". The three songs are placed at the end of the album so as to avoid an abrupt ending to the album. "Listen Before I Go" is an ambient song that features a gentle piano accompaniment and jazz influences while Eilish sings from the perspective of someone about to commit suicide, with faint street noises and sirens added at the beginning and end of the track for ambience. The following track, "I Love You", is similar in aesthetic and uses a sample of an airline attendant talking and a plane taking off. O'Connell has described the song as being about how "it sucks to be in love sometimes," while its chorus has drawn comparisons to Leonard Cohen's "Hallelujah", which have pleased the songwriter. The final song, "Goodbye", features a line of each of the album's tracks (with the exception of "!!!!!!!") in its lyrics in reverse order compared with how they appear in the album, beginning with a line from "I Love You" and ending with a line from "Bad Guy", with clips from these songs layered quietly in reverse as a motif representing when "you grow up listening to a tape and at the end, you reverse the tape to go back to the beginning of the song."

Artwork and packaging 
The cover artwork for When We All Fall Asleep, Where Do We Go? was photographed by Kenneth Cappello, with whom Eilish had previously collaborated for the artwork of her 2017 EP Don't Smile at Me. After working with the singer on pictures for her. magazine, Cappello was asked to photograph the artwork for her upcoming album. The shoot took place on Eilish's birthday in December at a studio in Los Angeles and lasted 12 hours. The singer had prepared sketches for the album cover which were inspired by the album's themes of night terrors and lucid dreaming, as well as Eilish's interest in horror films, specifically The Babadook. Cappello told MTV News that he "knew she wanted it moody". In order for it to "feel real", Cappello added no additional lighting to the end photo so as to give the impression that "a door was opening and that was the light coming into the bedroom." He additionally shot different variations of Eilish sitting on the bed expressing a range of emotions. Eilish wore contacts to fill in her eyes completely with white. She further wished to use a minimum of additional special effects and touch-ups on the end product to retain a sense of "realness and transparency".

Marketing and sales 
In 2018, Eilish released several singles, including "You Should See Me in a Crown" and "When the Party's Over", which would appear on the album. On January 29, 2019, the singer teased her debut album on social media for the first time, revealing its artwork and title. She also announced the release of a new single for following day at 9AM PT, which was revealed to be "Bury a Friend", alongside a music video and the album's track listing; the song became a hit for Eilish. On March 3, Eilish posted a snippet of an upcoming single named "Wish You Were Gay" in an Instagram post, alongside an announcement revealing that its release as the album's fourth single the following day at 9AM PT. A live video for the track recorded at a show in London that month was shared at the end of April. On March 16, Eilish performed as a headliner at the South by Southwest festival, singing fourteen songs including the four singles from When We All Fall Asleep accompanied by "elaborate videos" on a rear-end screen. Her performance was well received by critics.

When We All Fall Asleep, Where Do We Go? was released on March 29, 2019, alongside its fifth single "Bad Guy" and its music video. The song became a worldwide hit and among the four singles from the album to be certified multi-platinum in the US, along with "You Should See Me in a Crown", "When the Party's Over", and "Bury a Friend". "Wish You Were Gay" and "All the Good Girls Go to Hell", released on August 30 as the sixth single, were also certified platinum. "Ilomilo" was released as the seventh single on May 26, 2020. To celebrate the album's release, Eilish launched an immersive experience in partnership with Spotify, featuring several rooms that each symbolize a song from the album, with objects to smell, hear, and feel, reflecting the singer's synesthesia.

On April 7, 2019, When We All Fall Asleep, Where Do We Go? debuted at number one on the US Billboard 200 albums chart with 313,000 album-equivalent units consumed, of which 170,000 were pure album sales. The album also recorded 137,000 SEA units, which translates into 194 million on-demand audio streams for the album's songs in its first week, thus representing the third-biggest streaming week of all-time for an album by a woman. She was the eleventh artist to chart on the Billboard 200 under the age of 18. It was also the first album by a youngest female artist to top the chart in 10 years since Demi Lovato's 2009 album Here We Go Again. It later became the first by a youngest female to spend more than a week on the top of the chart in 20 years since Britney Spears with her 1999 album ...Baby One More Time. By June 20, 2019, When We All Fall Asleep had sold 1,304,000 equivalent album units, of which 343,000 are pure sales.

In Canada, the album debuted atop the national album chart with 46,000 total consumption units. By the end of June 2019, the album had been certified double platinum in Canada and was the best-selling record of the year in the country with 174,000 equivalent album units. In the United Kingdom, it also opened at number one on the country's Official Album Chart with 48,000 combined sales, making Eilish the youngest ever solo female act to top the chart. By its fourth week of release, it was certified gold by the BPI, indicating 100,000 sold in the country. It is the sixth best-selling album of the first half of 2019 in the UK, with 200,000 combined sales. In Australia, the album entered the ARIA Albums Chart at number one, with six of its songs occupying places in the top ten of the singles chart. In doing so, Eilish broke Ed Sheeran's record with the most songs with simultaneous placement in this area of the chart. It remained at this position for seven more non-consecutive weeks and has since been certified Platinum. The album returned to number one in Australia following its Album of the Year win at the 62nd Grammy Awards.

Worldwide, When We All Fall Asleep, Where Do We Go? had sold more than 1.2 million pure copies by December 2019, ranking as the fifth best-selling album of 2019 and third among female artists. Aided by the album's success, Eilish also ranked as the fourth best-selling artist of 2019 and second among female artists after Taylor Swift.

Touring 

The tour lasted through March 6 and included dates at Glasgow's SWG3 arena, Manchester Academy, the O2 Institute in Birmingham, and Shepherd's Bush Empire in London. It was later announced that she would perform a set of intimate acoustic shows at the Pryzm club in London on March 7.

Eilish also supported the album with a world tourthe When We All Fall Asleep Tour, which was announced in February 2019. It began in April of that year with two performances at Coachella, the first of which was universally praised by critics, some of whom hailed it as the highlight of the day despite technical difficulties regarding Vince Staples's microphone during his verse on the track "&Burn".

Eilish also appeared at the Groovin' the Moo festival, which took place throughout the end of April and beginning of May. Eilish was also part of the line-up of BBC Radio 1's Big Weekend on May 25 in Middlesbrough. At the Glastonbury Festival on June 30, Eilish appeared on the "Other Stage" as a warm up for British rapper Dave, backed only by her brother on keyboards, a drummer and a plain, black stage. Her slot received widespread critical acclaim, with reviewers citing her engagement with the audience and versatile performance as reasons for their praise.

Critical reception

When We All Fall Asleep, Where Do We Go? was met with widespread acclaim, with several critics praising its macabre subject matter, cohesiveness, and Eilish and O'Connell's songwriting abilities. At Metacritic, which assigns a normalized rating out of 100 to reviews from professional critics, the album has an average score of 82, based on 21 reviews. Aggregator AnyDecentMusic? gave it 7.5 out of 10, based on their assessment of the critical consensus.

Reviewing in March 2019 for The Daily Telegraph, Neil McCormick praised the album's lyrical content and wide range of musical influences, writing that "it sounds modern and old fashioned at the same time." NME reviewer Thomas Smith opined that it "ticks all the boxes for a memorable and game-changing debut album" and applauded its fun and original qualities. Matt Bobkin of Exclaim! remarked that the record displayed "a bold artistic vision and a willingness to move beyond the boundaries of pop conventions" and praised O'Connell's production as "meticulous". Writing for Pitchfork, Stacey Anderson credited When We All Fall Asleep's success to Eilish's "creepy eccentricity" which "helps distance her from the music industry's historically lewd maceration of teen idols." Christopher Thiessen of Consequence of Sound praised the album's "impressive cohesiveness and emotional engagement", and claimed that its production "perfectly complements" Eilish's vocals. The Guardian's Laura Snapes echoed these sentiments, additionally characterizing O'Connell's production as "compellingly nasty". Speculating as to the album's broader cultural impact, Kenneth Womack wrote for Salon in May that the singer has "staked her claim as the reigning queen of electropop" and "the new pop intelligentsia". While crediting O'Connell's production for elevating the "seamless storytelling", Womack said the album presents "a place that exists entirely within the miniature aural world" and is "like no place you've ever been before. Why? Because Eilish hadn't invented it yet."

A number of critics applauded Eilish's ability to discuss the sentiments of her generation. Q writer Dorian Lynskey characterized the release as a "surprising, haunting album" that "will speak powerfully both to her peers and to anyone who remembers how youth can sometimes feel like an overwhelming weight." Neil Z. Yeung of AllMusic named the singer "an avatar for an audience that deals with similar mental health struggles and growing pains", and suggested that the album pointed to "a bright future that could truly go in any direction, as messy and hopeful as youth can get." However, Chris Willman of Variety quipped that "you don't have to be under 21, or 71, to delight in real-dealness when you hear it," having dubbed Eilish "the real deal". Will Hodgkinson, writing for The Times, commended the record's assured nature and added that it "captures one of those rare moments when an artist knows exactly how her audience feels because she feels the same way too."

A few reviewers expressed reservations. Jason Lipshutz from Billboard deemed the album "often thrilling" despite, even due to, the "flaws ... intrinsic to its creator's truth" as listeners can hear Eilish is experimenting and "still figuring out what's in her bag of tricks". Roisin O'Connor was more critical in The Independent, panning its production as "subpar" and the record as "dull and bloated" overall.

Rankings 
At the end of 2019, When We All Fall Asleep, Where Do We Go? appeared on numerous lists of the year's top albums. According to Metacritic, it was the third most frequently ranked album in the top 10 of year-end lists. Several critics and publications ranked it number one, including veteran music critic Robert Christgau, who also named it the fourth-best album of the 2010s and said of Eilish, "No teenager I can recall has ever made such an impressive album, though I guess Elvis's Sun Sessions gets an asterisk, and who knows what will become of her?"

Industry awards 
At the 62nd Annual Grammy Awards in January 2020, When We All Fall Asleep, Where Do We Go? won Eilish and O'Connell Grammy Awards in the categories of Album of the Year and Best Pop Vocal Album, while "Bad Guy" won them awards for Record of the Year and Song of the Year. Eilish also received a Grammy for Best New Artist, and Finneas won for Producer of the Year and Best Engineered Album, Non-Classical (as one of the album's engineers). With her feat, Eilish became the second recording artist and first woman to win the ceremony's four major categoriesAlbum of the Year, Record of the Year, Song of the Year, and Best New Artistfor the same year.

Track listing

Notes
 All tracks are stylized in all lowercase.
 "Bury a Friend" features uncredited additional vocals by Mehki Raine.
 "My Strange Addiction" contains uncredited audio samples from the episode "Threat Level Midnight", of the television series The Office.
 "When I Was Older" was inspired by the motion picture Roma, and contains audio samples from the film.

Personnel
Credits adapted from the album's liner notes.
 
 Billie Eilish – all vocals, songwriting (1–6, 8, 10–14), additional producer (track 2)
 Finneas – producer, songwriting
 Rob Kinelski – mixing
 John Greenham – mastering

Charts

Weekly charts

Year-end charts

Decade-end charts

Certifications 

|-
! scope="row"| Iceland (FHF)
| Gold
| 2,500
|-

See also
 List of Billboard 200 number-one albums of 2019
 List of number-one albums of 2019 (Canada)
 List of UK Albums Chart number ones of 2019
 List of albums which have spent the most weeks on the UK Albums Chart

Notes

References

External links
 

2019 debut albums
Billie Eilish albums
Albums produced by Finneas O'Connell
Albums recorded in a home studio
Art pop albums
Avant-pop albums
Grammy Award for Album of the Year
Grammy Award for Best Engineered Album, Non-Classical
Grammy Award for Best Pop Vocal Album
Interscope Records albums
Juno Award for International Album of the Year albums